Evan Daniel Marzilli (born March 13, 1991) is an American former professional baseball center fielder. He was drafted by the Arizona Diamondbacks in the 8th round of the 2012 Major League Baseball draft.

Amateur career
Marzilli attended Bishop Hendricken High School in Warwick, Rhode Island, graduating in 2009. He enrolled at the University of South Carolina to play college baseball for the South Carolina Gamecocks. In 2011, he played collegiate summer baseball with the Chatham Anglers of the Cape Cod Baseball League.

Professional career

Arizona Diamondbacks
The Arizona Diamondbacks selected Marzilli in the eighth round of the 2012 MLB draft. He began his professional career with the Missoula Osprey of the Rookie-level Pioneer League. The Diamondbacks invited Marzilli to spring training in 2016. Marzilli spent 2016 with both the Reno Aces and the Mobile BayBears, where he hit .227 in 123 games. He became a free agent after the 2018 season.

Chicago Cubs
On December 18, 2018, Marzilli signed a minor league deal with the Chicago Cubs. He was released on March 24, 2019.

Gary SouthShore RailCats
On April 19, 2019, Marzilli signed with the Gary SouthShore RailCats of the independent American Association.

Arizona Diamondbacks (second stint)
His contract was purchased by the Arizona Diamondbacks on July 7, 2019. He became a free agent at the end of the season.

Eastern Reyes del Tigre
On February 21, 2020. Marzilli signed with the Sugar Land Skeeters of the Atlantic League of Professional Baseball. However, the ALPB season was later canceled due to the COVID-19 pandemic. Marzili stayed in Sugar Land and later signed on to play for the Eastern Reyes del Tigre of the Constellation Energy League (a makeshift four-team independent league created as a result of the pandemic) for the 2020 season. He was subsequently named to the league's all-star team.

Coaching career
In September 2020, Marzilli joined the Metropolitan State University of Denver as an assistant coach, a position which he held through January 2021.

References

External links

Living people
1991 births
Baseball outfielders
South Carolina Gamecocks baseball players
Chatham Anglers players
Minor league baseball players
Missoula Osprey players
Visalia Rawhide players
Mobile BayBears players
Salt River Rafters players
Reno Aces players
Arizona League Diamondbacks players
Jackson Generals (Southern League) players
Gary SouthShore RailCats players
Eastern Reyes del Tigre players